Ivan Belyayev may refer to:

 Ivan Belyayev (runner) (born 1935), Soviet athlete who competed in steeplechase
 Ivan Belyayev (footballer) (born 1986), Russian footballer